Dennis Corrigan (born 1944) is a contemporary American Surrealist known for his whimsical, sometimes dark, paintings, drawings, prints, and NFTS. His works are in permanent collections of the Metropolitan Museum of Art in New York City, the Brooklyn Museum, the Philadelphia Museum of Art, the Arts Council of Great Britain and the Library of Congress, in addition to numerous private collectors who range from priests to rock stars. His 1972 work Queen Victoria Troubled by Flies is in the collection of the Fine Arts Museums of San Francisco, He has accepted illustration commissions from The New York Times, New York Magazine, RCA Records, Random House Publishers, Pan American Airways, Horizon Magazine, David R. Godine publishers, Boston, Alfred A. Knopf Inc. in New York, and Dell Publishing.

He currently teaches Drawing, Painting and 2-D & 3-D Design art at Marywood University in Scranton, Pennsylvania. Other teaching appointments include Philadelphia College of Art, Tyler School of Art in Elkin's Park PA, and The Kubert School in Dover NJ.
His work can be viewed at www.denniscorrigan.com

References
 Dennis Corrigan Faculty profile page at Marywood University
  Queen Victoria Troubled by Flies (the picture is broken, see External links)
 Small exhibit of Corrigan's works at the River Gallery, Narrowsburg, New York

External links
 Queen Victoria Troubled by Flies (picture only)

1944 births
Living people
American illustrators